Ščurkovo is a small village east of Begunje pri Cerknici in the Municipality of Cerknica in the Inner Carniola region of Slovenia. It consists of a single farm on a side road. It has had no permanent residents since 1965, when the last inhabitants moved away.

References

External links
Ščurkovo on Geopedia

Populated places in the Municipality of Cerknica